Bansgaon is a village in Lakhimpur Kheri district, Uttar Pradesh, India.
It is 35 km away from the district city. It has a population of around 15,000, most of whom live by farming.

Villages in Lakhimpur Kheri district